Viggo, also spelled Wiggo, is a Nordic male name. There are two main theories about its origins:
 a latinised form of the Old Norse name Vigge, which is also found in the form of other Germanic names, such as Ludvig. It stems from old Norse 'vig', meaning "battle, fight".
 a variant of the Icelandic name Vöggur, coming from old Norse 'vöggr', "one who lies in a cradle".

People named Viggo include:

Viggo Bielefeldt (1851–1909), Danish composer
Viggo Brøndal (1887–1942), Danish philologist, professor of Romance languages and literature
Viggo Brodersen (1879–1965), Danish composer and pianist
Viggo Brun (1885–1978), Norwegian mathematician
Viggo Christensen(1880–1967), the first Lord Mayor of Copenhagen
Viggo Dibbern (1900–1981), Danish gymnast and Olympic medalist
Viggo Fausböll (1821–1908), Danish translator and Indologist 
Viggo Frederiksen (1916–1993), Danish boxer and Olympic competitor
Viggo Hagstrøm (1954–2013), Norwegian legal scholar and educator
Viggo Hansteen (1900–1941), Norwegian politician and member of the resistance
Viggo Hørup (1841–1902), Danish politician, journalist and agitator
Viggo Jensen (1874–1930), Danish weightlifter, shooter, gymnast and Olympic medalist
Viggo Jensen (1921–2005), Danish footballer 
Viggo Jensen (born 1947), Danish footballer
Viggo Johansen (1851–1935), Danish painter 
Viggo Johansen (born 1949), Norwegian journalist and television presenter
Viggo Johannessen (1936–2012), Norwegian statistician and civil servant
Viggo Kampmann (1910–1976), Prime Minister of Denmark
Viggo Larsen (1880–1957), Danish film actor, director and producer
Viggo Lindstrøm (1858–1926), Danish actor and theatre director
Viggo Mortensen (born 1958), Danish-American actor
Viggo Rivad (1922–2016), Danish photographer
Viggo Rørup (1903–1971), Danish painter
Viggo Stilling-Andersen (1893–1967), Danish fencer
Viggo Stoltenberg-Hansen (born 1942), Swedish mathematician and logician
Viggo Stuckenberg (1863–1905), Danish poet
Viggo Sundmoen (born 1954), Norwegian footballer 
Viggo Ullmann (1848–1910), Norwegian educator and politician
Viggo Widerøe (1904–2002), Norwegian aviator and entrepreneur
Viggo Wiehe (1874–1956), Danish actor

Danish masculine given names
Norwegian masculine given names